The 2021 Montana Grizzlies football team represented the University of Montana as a member of the Big Sky Conference during the 2021 NCAA Division I FCS football season. The Grizzlies were led by 11th-year head coach Bobby Hauck and played their home games at Washington–Grizzly Stadium in Missoula, Montana.

Previous season
The Grizzlies finished the season 2–0. They opted out of the conference season and played two non-conference games.

Preseason

Polls
On July 26, 2021, during the virtual Big Sky Kickoff, the Grizzlies were predicted to finish second in the Big Sky by both the coaches and media.

Preseason All–Big Sky team
The Grizzlies had five players selected to the preseason all-Big Sky team.

Offense

Samuel Akem – WR

Conlan Beaver – OT

Defense

Jace Lewis – LB

Robby Hauck – S

Special teams

Matthew O'Donoghue – LS

Schedule

Game summaries

at No. 20 (FBS) Washington

 The Grizzlies upset Washington 13-7, becoming the 5th FCS team to beat a Top-25 FBS team.

Western Illinois

Cal Poly

at No. 6 Eastern Washington

Dixie State

Sacramento State

at Idaho

Southern Utah

at Northern Colorado

at Northern Arizona

No. 3 Montana State

No. 4 Eastern Washington

FCS Playoffs

No. 4 Eastern Washington–Second Round

at No. 3 James Madison–Quarterfinal

Ranking movements

References

Montana
Montana Grizzlies football seasons
2021 NCAA Division I FCS playoff participants
Montana Grizzlies football